The Timurid wars of succession are a set of three wars of succession in Central Asia waged between princes of the Timurid Empire during the 15th century and early 16th century following deaths of important monarchs.

 First Timurid war of succession (1405–1409/11), after the death of Timur the Lame
 Second Timurid war of succession (1447–1459), after the death of Shahrukh Mirza
 Third Timurid war of succession (1469–1507), after the death of Abu Sa'id Mirza

See also 
 Mughal war of succession (disambiguation)
 Persian war of succession (disambiguation)

References 

 
Civil wars involving the states and peoples of Asia
Wars of succession involving the states and peoples of Asia